Lanka Sagar is a water project centered on an earth-fill dam on the Kuttalair River (Krishna Godavari Basin) near Adivimallala village in Andhra Pradesh, India. The villages of Rajugudem, Chowdavaram, Pallewada, Lankasagar are located around this project. It was built in 1968. The purpose of the dam is water supply for irrigation and drinking water.

Specifications

See also
 List of reservoirs and dams in India

References

Dams in Andhra Pradesh
Dams completed in 1968
Earth-filled dams
1968 establishments in Andhra Pradesh
20th-century architecture in India